Filippo Spinola, 2nd Marquis of Los Balbases (1594 in Genoa, Italy – 8 August 1659 in Madrid, Spain) was a  Grandee of Spain, duke of San Severino, a Knight of the Order of the Golden Fleece, General of the Spanish Army and President of the Supreme Council of Flanders.

He was the son of Ambrogio Spinola, 1st Marquis of the Balbases  (Genoa, Italy, 1569 – 25 September 1630), 1st duke of Sesto (title awarded in Naples on 2 April 1612), granted the Grandee of Spain on 17 December 1621 with his marquisate, Conqueror of Breda, 1623, Governor of the Duchy of Milan, also a Knight of the Order of the Golden Fleece, 1631,  and Giovanetta Bacciadone y Doria (1597–1615).

Filippo married Gironima Doria having five boys and one girl, later a nun, the third one being the first to survive after his childhood, and being therefore known as Paolo Vincenzo Spínola, 3rd marquis of Los Balbases (Milan, Italy, after February 1628 – Madrid, Spain, 23 December 1699).

1594 births
1659 deaths
Grandees of Spain
Knights of the Golden Fleece
Marquesses of Spain
Dukes of Spain
Emigrants from the Republic of Genoa to Spain